Founder of entertainment, management, and publishing company BeGenius, RushDee McCoy Williams (born August 19, 1987), known professionally as RushDee, is an American record producer, songwriter, and recording artist from Saginaw, Michigan. As a songwriter and producer, RushDee has contributed to projects released by recording artists such as Nipsey Hussle, Lil Wayne, Fabolous, and Currensy.

Activism 

In March 2021, Williams assisted in organizing a protest that took place outside of a Saginaw pizzeria days after a dispute transpired between Williams and the manager of the business. After attempted correspondence on behalf of local news media, the owner of the company issued a statement and the manager was fired.

Musical career 

Via coordination with film producer Randall Emmett, Williams procured his first credits for film score composition with Reprisal and later Hard Kill, both productions of Lionsgate Films. Williams would later move on to working on Television productions such as Love and Hip-Hop: Miami, Black Ink: Chicago, House Hunters, Top Elf, David Makes Man, and the NBA 2K video game series.

Williams operates in the capacity of artist management and has a history of lending his expertise to upcoming recording artists including student attendees of Sylvester Broome Empowerment Village within the Flint Community Schools district.

Artistry

Musical influences 

Recording artists such as Jay-Z, Master P, DMX, Tupac and producers Pharrell Williams, Timbaland, Metro Boomin, Quincy Jones, and Rick Rubin have been cited to be inspirations to Williams' musical development.

Williams also accredits his musical influence to his grandmother, a singer and director of her church choir and his father an instrumentalist playing the conga drums and saxophone.

Production and writing discography

2017 
'Fabolous & Jadakiss – Friday On Elm Street

 11. "Nightmares Ain't As Bad"

2018 
Reprisal (film) – Original Soundtrack

 "Armor Hero"

2019 
Currensy, Trademark Da Skydiver Young Roddy – Plan of Attack 

 12. "Still Coolie in the Cut"

2021 
Yung Mal – 1.5 Way or No Way

 13. "1.5 Way or No Way"

Mozzy – "Untreated Trauma"

 5. "Reeboks"

References

External links 

 Official Website

Living people
1987 births
Musicians from Michigan